Lucky 7 is an American drama television series that ran from September 24, to October 1, 2013, on ABC as part of the 2013–14 American television season. The one-hour series is based on the British television show The Syndicate, which was created by Kay Mellor. Steven Spielberg phoned Kay Mellor to tell her how much he loved the original, and a few months later became an executive producer on Lucky 7. ABC placed a series order on May 10, 2013. The pilot episode earned only 1.3 rating in the 18- to 49-year-old demographic, making Lucky 7 the lowest rated fall drama premiere in ABC history.

On October 4, 2013, ABC canceled the series due to low ratings. It was the first show of the 2013–14 season to be canceled. As of now, ABC is still uncertain if it will air the remaining episodes.

On September 25, 2014, ABC released all the episodes produced on iTunes, which were a total of 8 episodes.

Premise
A group of seven gas station employees in Queens, New York City, play the lottery every week and dream about what they would do with the winnings. When they do finally hit the jackpot, the coworkers learn that money may solve some problems, but it creates new ones.

Cast and characters

Main cast 
 Summer Bishil as Samira Rajpur
 Lorraine Bruce as Denise Dibinsky
 Alexandra Castillo as Bianca Clemente
 Christine Evangelista as Mary Lavecchia
 Stephen Louis Grush as Nicky Korzak
 Matt Long as Matt Korzak
 Anastasia Phillips as Leanne Maxwell
 Luis Antonio Ramos as Antonio Clemente
 Isiah Whitlock, Jr. as Bob Harris

Recurring cast
 Stephen Rider as Eric Mosely
Kim Roberts as Gloria

Episodes

Reception
Kristin dos Santos of E! Online said the show is not unique enough to make it memorable. David Hinckley of the New York Daily News gave the show 3 out of 5 stars.

See also
The Millionaire
Lottery!
Windfall

References

Notes

External links
 

2010s American drama television series
2013 American television series debuts
2013 American television series endings
American Broadcasting Company original programming
American television series based on British television series
English-language television shows
Television series by ABC Studios
Television shows set in New York City
Television series by Amblin Entertainment
Works about lotteries